St. Joseph's Church (Polish: Kościół Świętego Józefa) in Zabrze is a Roman Catholic church built from 1930-1931 in the Expressionist style. It is one of several Brick Expressionist buildings designed by Dominikus Böhm (1880–1955). It is located on the southwest side of central Zabrze at Ulica Franklina Roosevelta 104.

History 

Groundbreaking for the church began on 31 August 1930. The parish of St. Joseph was founded in 1931, taking over part of the territory of St. Andrew's Parish, and the new church was completed in December 1931. On 4 September 1932, St. Joseph's Church was festively consecrated by Cardinal Adolf Bertram (1859–1945), the Archbishop of Breslau.

Architecture 

The church's entrance represents the "Porta Sacra" (Gateway to Heaven), with two round archways supporting a masonry screen of 12 smaller arches. On the east side is a tower with 40 arched windows representing the 40 years the Israelites wandered through the Sinai from Egypt to Canaan.

The interior is 67.5 meters long and 26 meters wide. The presbytery with the altar is elevated 2 meters above the floor; underneath that is a Miner's Chapel with 10 arched windows, featuring an altar to St. Barbara built by miners out of coal in the 1930s.

One of the stained glass windows in the church shows three scenes from scriptures concerning the Eucharist, and another shows the Holy Family. Behind and above the entrance is a rose window.

References 
 Dariusz Walerjański: Zabrze - Schritt für Schritt, 2006

External links 

 Parish of St. Joseph in Zabrze (in Polish)
 Sights and attractions in Zabrze (in Polish)
 

Zabrze Joseph
Zabrze Joseph
1931 establishments in Poland
Zabrze Joseph
Buildings and structures in Zabrze